Getap is a village in the Yeghegnadzor Municipality of the Vayots Dzor Province in Armenia. The village is famous for its wine production. Most of the villagers are descendants of Armenians from Salmas in Iran who came to the region in the 1800s.

Etymology 
The village was previously known as Koytur.

Gallery

References

External links 

Populated places in Vayots Dzor Province